Ochrodota atra is a moth of the subfamily Arctiinae first described by Rothschild in 1909. It is found in Peru.

References

Phaegopterina